Doliobatis is an extinct genus of guitarfish that lived during the Early Jurassic. It contains one valid species, D. weisi, which has been found in Luxembourg. It was originally referred to the family "Archaeobatidae", but was later reassigned to the family Rhinobatidae.

References

Rhinobatidae
Prehistoric cartilaginous fish genera